Hakea adnata is a shrub in the family Proteaceae native to the south coast of Western Australia. It is multi-stemmed shrub that produces masses of white scented flowers from late winter to spring.

Description
Smaller branches and new growth are a rusty colour. Each inflorescence has 2-6  sweetly scented white flowers in leaf axils. Fruit have a smooth to slightly rough surface with a short upturned beak. Flowers from July to October.

Taxonomy and naming
Hakea adnata was first formally described by the botanist Robert Brown in 1830 and the description was published in Supplementum primum Prodromi florae Novae Hollandiae. The only known synonym is Hakea lativalvis.
The specific epithet (adnata) is derived from Latin meaning "united with" the significance of which is unknown, as there is no reference to it in the original description.

Distribution
Hakea adnata has a scattered distribution along the south coast in the Goldfields-Esperance region of Western Australia with the bulk of the population found between Norseman, Esperance and Cape Arid National Park. Hakea adnata is found on flats and around salt lakes where it grows in sandy clay and gravelly sandy soils as a part of Banksia speciosa heathland or shrub mallee communities.

References

adnata
Eudicots of Western Australia
Plants described in 1830